Älvsborg or Elfsborg may refer to:

Military

Fortresses
Old Älvsborg, a ruined mediaeval castle on the Göta River in Gothenburg, Sweden
New Älvsborg, a sea fort on the island of Kyrkogårdsholmen in Gothenburg, Sweden
Älvsborg Fortress, a 19th-century fortress at the mouth of the Göta River
Fort Nya Elfsborg, a 17th-century colonial fort on the Delaware River in modern New Jersey

Other military uses
, a minelayer of the Swedish Navy
Älvsborg Regiment, a former infantry regiment based in Borås
Älvsborg Coastal Artillery Regiment, a former regiment of the Swedish Coastal Artillery
Älvsborg Brigade, a former infantry brigade in Sweden's Western Military District

Sports
Älvsborgs FF, a football club in Gothenburg
IF Elfsborg, a professional football club based in Borås
SK Elfsborg, a swimming club in Borås; see List of Swedish Swimming Championships champions (women)

Other uses
Älvsborg, Gothenburg, a borough of Gothenburg, Sweden
Älvsborg County, a former county in Sweden
Älvsborg Line, a railway line in Sweden

See also